Mount Berry is a mountain 3 miles (4.8 km) southeast of Baldwin Peak, near the head of Cayley Glacier in northern Graham Land. It was photographed by the Falkland Islands and Dependencies Aerial Survey Expedition (FIDASE) in 1956–57, and mapped from these photos by the Falkland Islands Dependencies Survey (FIDS). The mountain was named by the United Kingdom Antarctic Place-Names Committee (UK-APC) in 1960 for Albert Berry, the American aviator who in 1912 made the first parachute descent from an airplane, using a pack-type parachute.

Mountains of Graham Land
Nordenskjöld Coast